Warner Music Latina (formerly WEA Latina) is a record label part of Warner Music Group that focuses on Latin music. The record label was established in 1987.

List of artists currently on Warner Music Latina

Alaya
Alex Ubago
Andres Calamaro
Bohemia Suburbana
Bonny Lovy
Buika
Cosculluela
DannyLux
David Amaya
David Cavazos
David DeMaria
David Soliz
Dawer X Damper to Colombia
De La Ghetto
Diana Navarro
El Sueño de Morfeo
Fangoria
Fito & Fitipaldis
Francisco Céspedes
Gilberto Gil
Hombres G
Huecco
Isabella Castillo
Ivan Lins
Jarabe De Palo
Jesse & Joy
Jorge Drexler
Jorge Villamizar 
Junior H
Kidd Keo 
La Ley
Las Villa from Colombia
Laura Pausini
Lena
Lit Killah
Los Claxons
Luis Miguel
Lupe Fiasco
Mägo de Oz
Maná
Manuel Medrano
Mariana Ochoa
Maite Perroni
Matamba
Maxiolly to Colombia
MC Davo
Miguel Bosé
Mijares
Motel
Pablo Alborán
Paulo Londra
Pedro Infante
Piso 21
Reykon
Sie7e
Sofia Reyes
Tommy Torres
Ximena Sariñana
Yahir
Zion y Lennox

List of artists formerly on Warner Music Latina

Alejandro Sanz
Bacilos
Banda Machos
Banda Pequeños Musical
Casa de Leones
Charlie Cruz
El Poder Del Norte (known as Los Pioneros while under contract to WEA)
El Tri
Frankie Negrón
Glenn Monroig
Olga Tañón
Pesado
Ricardo Arjona (his independent label Metamorfosis is distributed by Warner Music Latina)
Ricardo Montaner
Tego Calderón
Tigrillos
Tito Nieves
Wilkins (singer)
Yolandita Monge

See also
 List of Warner Music Group labels

References

External links
Official Warner Music Latina website (archive)

Warner Music labels
Latin music record labels
Record labels established in 1987
Companies based in Miami